The , also written as yōon, is a feature of the Japanese language in which a mora is formed with an added  sound, i.e., palatalized, or (more rarely in the modern language) with an added  sound, i.e. labialized.

Yōon are represented in hiragana using a kana ending in i, such as き (ki), plus a smaller version of one of the three y kana, ya, yu or yo. For example, kyō, "today" (今日), is written きょう [], using a small version of the yo kana, よ. Contrast this with kiyō, "skillful" (器用), which is written きよう [], with a full-sized yo kana. In historical kana orthography, yōon were not distinguished with the smaller kana, and had to be determined by context.

In earlier stages of Japanese, and in certain dialects, yōon can also be formed with the kana wa, wi, we, and wo; for example, くゎ/クヮ kwa,　くゐ/クヰ kwi, くゑ/クヱ kwe,　くを/クヲ kwo.  Although obsolete in modern Japanese, kwa and kwi can still be found in several of the Ryukyuan languages today, while kwe is formed with the digraph くぇ.  Instead of the kana き, these are formed with the kana for ku, く/ク.

Table
{| border="0" style="margin: 1em auto 1em auto" |
|+ Yōon (拗音)
|- valign=top align="center"
|

|
{| class="wikitable" style="margin: 1em 1em 1em 1em" |
|-
|colspan=4 align=center|hiragana
|- valign=top align="center"
| 
! ゃ ya
! ゅ yu
! ょ yo
|- valign=top align="center"
!き ki
|きゃ kya
|きゅ kyu
|きょ kyo
|- valign=top align="center"
!し shi
|しゃ sha
|しゅ shu
|しょ sho
|- valign=top align="center"
!ち chi
|ちゃ cha
|ちゅ chu
|ちょ cho
|- valign=top align="center"
!に ni
|にゃ nya
|にゅ nyu
|にょ nyo
|- valign=top align="center"
!ひ hi
|ひゃ hya
|ひゅ hyu
|ひょ hyo
|- valign=top align="center"
!み mi
|みゃ mya
|みゅ myu
|みょ myo
|- valign=top align="center"
!り ri
|りゃ rya
|りゅ ryu
|りょ ryo
|-
|colspan=4 align=center|dakuten
|- valign=top align="center"
!ぎ gi
|ぎゃ gya|ぎゅ gyu|ぎょ gyo|- valign=top align="center"
!じ ji|じゃ ja|じゅ ju|じょ jo|- valign=top align="center"
!び bi|びゃ bya|びゅ byu|びょ byo|-
|colspan=4 align=center|handakuten
|- valign=top align="center"
!ぴ pi|ぴゃ pya|ぴゅ pyu|ぴょ pyo|}
|}

Other representations

In Japanese Braille, Yōon is indicated with one of the yōon, yōon+dakuten, or yōon+handakuten prefixes.

Unlike in kana, Braille yōon is prefixed to the -a/-u/-o syllables, rather than appending ya, yu or yo to an -i kana, e.g. kyu'': きゅ - ki + yu →  - yōon + ku. Likewise, the -w- syllables are indicated by a prefix of the -a/-i/-e/-o syllables, rather than an -u syllable, e.g. くぁ / くゎ (kwa) = -w- + ka: .

Japanese phonology
Kana
Japanese writing system terms